James Augustine Duff (27 September 1872 – 4 March 1943) was a Scottish-born Northern Irish businessman and Ulster Unionist Party politician.

Born in Glasgow, he was educated locally before moving to Belfast. He sat on Belfast City Council, served as the city's Justice of the Peace, and was the High Sheriff of Belfast  in 1923. He represented Belfast East in the Parliament of Northern Ireland from 1921 to 1925. Defeated at the 1925 election he contested the new Belfast Pottinger seat at the 1929 election but was not elected as the seat was taken by Jack Beattie.

Away from politics, Duff was President of the St. Andrews Society from 1925 to 1926 as well as President of the Belfast Scottish Association.

References

External links
 

1872 births
1943 deaths
Ulster Unionist Party members of the House of Commons of Northern Ireland
High Sheriffs of Belfast
Members of the House of Commons of Northern Ireland 1921–1925
Politicians from Glasgow
Businesspeople from Northern Ireland
Members of the House of Commons of Northern Ireland for Belfast constituencies